Smollett is an English and Scots surname, originally meaning small head. 

Notable people with the surname include:

Individuals 
 Jake Smollett (born 1989), American actor
 Jurnee Smollett (born 1986), American actress 
 Jussie Smollett (born 1982), American actor
 Jussie Smollett hate crime hoax, 2019 criminal case in Chicago
 Peter Smollett (1912–1980), Austrian-born British journalist and Russian spy
 Tobias Smollett (1721–1771), Scottish author

Fictional characters 

 Captain Alexander Smollett, the captain of the Hispaniola in the novel Treasure Island
 Col. William G. Smollett, a character in the 1944 film Since You Went Away, played by Monty Woolley